Allanwater Bridge railway station is located in the Allan Water area of the Canadian province of Ontario, just west of where the railway line crosses the river Allan Water over a truss bridge. This station is served by Via Rail. Transcontinental Canadian trains stop here under Via Rail's Special Stop Request program.

There is no permanent settlement at Allan Water; however, the station serves a number of recreational properties and wilderness lodges, and as an access point to Wabakimi Provincial Park. The area was also formerly home to a trading post operated by the Hudson's Bay Company with a small Anglican church dedicated to St. Barnabas.

References

External links
St. Barnabas Anglican Church in Allanwater Bridge, Ontario

Via Rail stations in Ontario
Railway stations in Thunder Bay District
Canadian National Railway stations in Ontario
Allanwater Bridge
Allanwater Bridge